Mark Mason is an American public address announcer for the Portland Trail Blazers of the National Basketball Association.

Mason began working as the Trail Blazers' public address announcer at the start of the 1996–97 NBA season. Since his start, he has announced every preseason and regular season game and reached 843 consecutive regular season games before a health crisis ended the streak in April, 2016. In October, 2016, after a six-month recovery he resumed his spot courtside to begin the 2016-2017 NBA season.

A native of Southern California, Mason's radio broadcast career path took him to Portland, Oregon in 1995 where he hosts the "Mark Mason Show", a local news–talk show. The show airs afternoons on KEX 1190 in Portland.

Mason is known for including "native-language introductions" for the team's foreign players, a "6th Man" catch-phrase, and the anticipatory "Are you ready...for your Portland Trail Blazers!" According to Mason, his introduction of Trail Blazers guard Damian Lillard is the first introduction of an NBA player by letter rather than number. (O, for Lillard's regional basketball resume: Oakland, Ogden, and Oregon.)

References

External links
Mason introduces 2016-2017 Trailblazers at Fan Fest
Mark Mason gives update on his health crisis
The Rip City Niner (January 2015)
 Blazers PA announcer will never forget the night he handed the mic to Damian Lillard (November 2014)
 Mason profiled by FOX-12TV, Portland (April 2015)
5 Things to Love about the Rose Garden Arena.
Team intros at the Moda Center, 2014.
Mason: 49ers Fan in Seahawks Country, 2014. 
Mason profiled by KATU-TV, Portland (April 2009)
...The Letter 'O'

Living people
American sports announcers
National Basketball Association public address announcers
Year of birth missing (living people)
People from Glendale, California
Radio personalities from Portland, Oregon